Pastida is a village on the Greek island of Rhodes. It is located slightly inland from the west coast on the northern tip of Rhodes, 5 miles from Trianta and 10 miles from Rhodes Town, on the foot of mount Philerimos. In Latin, the name of the village means "castle". It is a part of the municipal unit of Petaloudes.

References

External links
 Official website of Municipality of Petaloudes 

Populated places in Rhodes